Latkinsky is a rural locality (a settlement) and the administrative center of Korolyovsky Selsoviet, Tyumentsevsky District, Altai Krai, Russia. The population was 36 as of 2013. It was founded in 1918. There are 2 streets.

Geography 
Latkinsky is located 21 km south of Tyumentsevo (the district's administrative centre) by road. Korolyovsky is the nearest rural locality.

References 

Rural localities in Tyumentsevsky District